Jean Duceppe is a French-Canadian biographical television mini-series that aired on Télé-Québec in 2002. It told the story of Jean Duceppe, a Canadian actor, and chronicled his life, in particular his work in theatre and struggle for Quebec independence. It also followed his wife Hélène Rowley and his son Gilles Duceppe, who would later become prominent as the leader of the Bloc Québécois.

The series starred Paul Doucet as Jean Duceppe and Suzanne Clément as Hélène Rowley.

See also
List of Quebec television series
Television of Quebec
Culture of Quebec
History of Quebec

Television shows filmed in Quebec
2002 Canadian television series debuts
2000s Canadian television miniseries